Jaleen is a given name. Notable people with the given name include:
 Jaleen Roberts (born 1998), American track and field athlete
 Jaleen Smith (born 1994), American-born Croatian professional basketball player